The Port de la Daurade is found on the right bank of the Garonne River in Toulouse. Boats leave from here for travel on the Garonne and the Canal du Midi. The Canal de Brienne is near as is the bazacle. 

Buildings and structures in Toulouse
Transport in Toulouse
Ports and harbours of France